Heping District is a mountain indigenous district in eastern Taichung, Taiwan, and it is the largest district of Taichung City. It is also the largest district in Taiwan by area. It is the geographic center of Taiwan.

History
After the handover of Taiwan from Japan to the Republic of China in 1945, Heping was organized as a Mountain indigenous township of Taichung County. On 7 June 1973, two northeast most villages of the township were separated to form a new county-level division, which was Lishan Constructing Administrative Bureau. However, the bureau was dissolved on 18 February 1982 and the two villages were returned to the township. On 25 December 2010, Taichung County was merged with Taichung City and Heping was upgraded to a district of the city.

Geography

Demographics
As of February 2023, the district comprises 10,889 residents, of which around 4,000 are Atayal people.

Economy
Native products of Heping District are apple, honey, vegetable, mountain fish, peach and bamboo.

Administrative divisions
Nanshi, Tianlun, Boai, Ziyou, Daguan, Zhongkeng, Lishan and Pingdeng Village.

Infrastructures
 Ma'an Dam

Tourist attractions
 Baigu Mountain
 Basianshan National Forest Recreation Area
 Dajian Mountain
 Dajia River
 Dasyueshan National Forest Recreation Area
 Eight Immortals Mountain
 Fushoushan Farm
 Guguan Hot Spring
 Kukuan Dam
 Lishan Culture Museum
 Ma'an Dam
 Mount Nanhu
 Mount Xue
 Qingshan Dam
 Techi Dam
 Tienlun Dam
 Wuling Farm
 Wuling National Forest Recreation Area

Transportation

The Provincial Highway 8 passes through Heping District to the east side of the island. On 21 September 1999, the 921 earthquake caused severe damage to the road, and is unlikely to be repaired. The section east of Guguan is now permanently closed to non-residents. Provincial Highway No. 14A now serves as an alternate route.

Notable natives
 Kao Chin Su-mei, member of Legislative Yuan

See also
 Taichung

References

Districts of Taichung